Černovice is name of several locations in the Czech Republic:

Černovice (Blansko District), a municipality and village in the South Moravian Region
Černovice (Chomutov District), a municipality and village in the Ústí nad Labem Region
Černovice (Pelhřimov District), a town in the Vysočina Region
Černovice (Plzeň-South District), a municipality and village in the Plzeň Region

See also
Chernivtsi, a city in Ukraine, called Černovice in Czech